Realme (stylized as realme) is a Chinese consumer electronics manufacturer based in Shenzhen, Guangdong. It was founded by Li Bingzhong (known as Sky Li) on May 4, 2018, who was former vice president of Oppo. Started originally as a sub-brand of Oppo, Realme eventually ventured as its own brand. Realme then became the fastest-growing 5G smartphone brand in Q3 2021 with an 831% growth rate.

History 
 Realme company was founded on May 4, 2018. Before that it was a sub-brand of Oppo, which is itself a subsidiary of BBK Electronics, until its formation as a spinoff on May 4, 2018.
 In May 2018, they released their first phone, Realme 1.
 On July 30, 2018, Sky Li announced his resignation from Oppo and his intention to establish Realme as an independent brand on Sina Weibo.
 On November 15, 2018, Realme adopted a new logo.
 On November 22, 2018, Realme became an emerging brand in the Indian market. The sales of Realme devices in India have since surpassed the sales of Oppo. Realme has been the fourth largest smartphone brand in India since 2019, behind Xiaomi, Samsung, and Vivo. Realme holds records in India for fastest-charging smartphone and India's first 5G smartphone.
 On May 15, 2019, Realme held its first conference in Beijing to enter the Chinese domestic market, launching the Realme X, Realme X Lite and Realme X Master Edition.
 In June 2019, Realme announced its entry into the European market.
 On June 26, 2019, Realme released its first photo taken with its 64MP camera.
 By July 2019, Realme had entered markets including China, South Asia, Southeast Asia and Europe.
 By August 2019, Realme surpassed 10 million users.
 In August 2019, Realme showed a prototype device with a quadruple 64MP camera in China and India.
 In 2021, the brand had a user base in Europe and Asia that one review described as "fairly wide".
 In June 2021, C11 2021 was launched, that comes with Android Go 11.
 On May 16, 2022, Francis Wong takes over as CEO of Realme Europe.
 On May 18, 2022, Realme announces Narzo 50 5G and 50 Pro 5G.
 In June 2022, C30 was launched, that comes with Android Go 11
 In June 2022, narzo 50i Prime, that comes with Android Go 11

Products 

The company has a large number of products, particularly in the Indian market.

 Realme 1
 Realme 2/2 Pro
 Realme U1
 Realme 3/3 Pro
 Realme 5/5 Pro
 Realme 6i/6/6 Pro
 Realme 7i/7/7 Pro
 Realme 8i/8/8s/8 Pro
 Realme 9i/9 4G/9 SE/9 Pro 5G/9 Pro+ 5G
 Realme 10/10 Pro 5G/10 Pro+ 5G

Marketing 
Realme's popularity online can be attributed to its successful utilization of community-driven resources such as Facebook. In 2018, Realme Philippines created the Squad Leader Program.

According to Realme, the initial three Squad Leaders will help provide information to community members and help manage the official Facebook communities in exchange for Realme perks which includes official Realme products and internal merchandise. 

From less than 5,000 members at the end of 2018, the Squad Leader Program was able to grow the company's official Facebook community to over 500,000 combined community members. This makes it one of the largest official Facebook communities of any smartphone brand in the country.

Currently, the Squad Leader Program has over 7 members, all of them work for free.

References

External links 
 

Realme
Chinese brands
Mobile phone manufacturers
Chinese companies established in 2018
Electronics companies of China
Privately held companies of China
Mobile phone companies of China
2018 establishments in China
BBK Electronics